Simon Phillips (born 1958) is a New Zealand-Australian director of theatre, musicals and opera. He is a former Artistic Director of Melbourne Theatre Company.

Phillips graduated from Toi Whakaari: New Zealand Drama School in 1980 with a Diploma in Acting. Phillips directed the original 2015 production of Tim Finn's musical Ladies in Black for the Queensland Theatre in Brisbane which then travelled to Melbourne and toured Australia in 2017.

References

External links
Simon Phillips Broadway and theatre credits, broadwayworld.com

Profile, HLA Management

1958 births
Australian theatre directors
Australian opera directors
New Zealand emigrants to Australia
Date of birth missing (living people)
Helpmann Award winners
Living people
Toi Whakaari alumni